Ragnvald Mikal Andersen (26 March 1899 – 28 February 1995) was a Norwegian politician for the Labour Party.

He was born in Bergen.

He was elected to the Norwegian Parliament from Bergen in 1958, but was not re-elected. He had previously served as a deputy representative during the term 1954–1957, and later served in the same position from 1961–1965.

On the local level Andersen was a member of Bergen city council from 1954 to 1959.

Andersen spent his entire career as a ship mechanic, and was active in the Norwegian Confederation of Trade Unions.

References

1899 births
1995 deaths
Members of the Storting
Labour Party (Norway) politicians
Politicians from Bergen
Norwegian trade unionists
20th-century Norwegian politicians